Alfred T. Palmer (March 17, 1906 – January 31, 1993) was a photographer best known for his photographs depicting Americana during World War II as an Office of War Information photographer from 1942 until 1943.

Gallery

References

External links

Alfred T. Palmer profile at the National Archives

1906 births
1993 deaths
20th-century American photographers
Artists from San Jose, California
People of the United States Office of War Information
Photographers from California